This is a list of association football clubs located in Slovenia, sorted alphabetically. The clubs without an article are not listed.

Men's clubs

A
ND Adria
NK Aluminij

B
ŠNK Bakovci
ND Beltinci
ND Bilje
NK Bistrica (Slovenska Bistrica)
NK Bled
NK Branik Šmarje
NK Bravo
NK Brda
NK Brežice
NK Brinje Grosuplje
NK Britof

C
NK Celje
NK Cerknica
ŠD Cven

Č
NK Čarda
NK Črenšovci
ND Črnuče

D
NK Dekani
NK Dob
NK Domžale
FC Drava Ptuj
ND Dravinja
NK Dravograd

F
NK Fužinar

G
ND Gorica
NK Goričanka
NK Grad

H
NK Hrastnik

I
NK IB 1975 Ljubljana
ND Ilirija 1911
NK Ilirska Bistrica
NK Ivančna Gorica
MNK Izola
ŠD Ižakovci

J
NK Jadran Hrpelje-Kozina
NK Jesenice
NK Jezero Medvode

K
NK Kamnik
NK Kočevje
NK Kolpa
NK Komenda
FC Koper
NK Korte
NK Kovinar Štore
NK Kranj
NK Krim
ŠD NK Križevci
NK Krka
NK Krško

L
NK Limbuš-Pekre
NK Ljutomer

M
NK Malečnik
NK Maribor
NK Mons Claudius
NŠ Mura

N
NK Nafta 1903
NK Naklo

O
NK Odranci
NK Olimpija Ljubljana (2005)

P
NK Peca
NK Plama Podgrad
NK Pohorje
NK Portorož Piran
ND Primorje
DNŠ Prevalje
NK Puconci

R
NK Rače
NK Radeče
NK Radenska Slatina
ŠNK Radgona
NK Radomlje
NK Rakičan
ND Renkovci
NK Rogaška
ŠD Rogoza
NK Rudar Trbovlje
NK Rudar Velenje

S
NK Sava Kranj
NK Serdica
ND Slovan
ND Slovenj Gradec
NK Središče ob Dravi
ŠD Stojnci
NK Svoboda Kisovec
NK Svoboda Ljubljana

Š
NK Šalovci
NK Šampion
NK Šenčur
NK Šentjur
NK Šmarje pri Jelšah
NK Šmartno
NK Šmartno 1928
NK Šoštanj

T
NK Tabor Sežana
NK Tolmin
NK Triglav Kranj
NK Tromejnik
NK Turnišče

V
NK Veržej
NK Vipava
NK Vodice Šempas

Z
NK Zagorje
DNŠ Zavrč
NK Zreče

Ž
NK Žalec
NK Žiri

Defunct clubs

I. SSK Maribor
NK Ankaran
Athletik SK
NK Bela Krajina
NK Beltinci
SC Bonifika
NK Branik Maribor
NK Branik Solkan
ŽŠD Celje
NK Drava Ptuj
NK Elkroj Mozirje
NK Grafičar Ljubljana
NK Grosuplje
NK Izola
SK Jadran
NK Korotan Prevalje
NK Kovinar Maribor
FC Ljubljana
NK Ljubljana
SK Ljubljana
NK Maribor B
NK Mengeš
NK Mura
ND Mura 05
NK Nafta Lendava
NK Olimp Celje
NK Olimpija
NK Partizan
NK Piran
NK Postojna (until 1999)
NK Postojna (1999–2018)
ASK Primorje
NK Primorje
SV Rapid Marburg
NK Renče
SK Rote Elf
NK Šentjur
NK Slavija Vevče
NK Šmartno ob Paki
NK Steklar
NK Stol Virtus
NK Zavrč
NK Železničar Maribor

Women's clubs
ŽNK Krka (defunct)
ŽNK MB Tabor
ŽNK Mura
ŽNK Olimpija Ljubljana
ŽNK Radomlje
ŽNK Škale
ŽNK Slovenj Gradec (defunct)

 
Slovenia
clubs
Football clubs